Liushan is a town in Liunan District, Liuzhou, in Guangxi, China. , it administers Liushan Residential Community and the following seven villages: 
Liushan Village
Liutang Village
Dashi Village
Guangrong Village
Zhenglan Village
Xinlong Village
Xin'ai Village

Before 2019 the town was under administration of Liujiang District.

References

Towns of Guangxi
Liuzhou